William Maclure (27 October 176323 March 1840) was an Americanized Scottish geologist, cartographer and philanthropist. He is known as the 'father of American geology'. As a social experimenter on new types of community life, he collaborated with British social reformer Robert Owen, (1771–1854), in Indiana, United States.

Maclure had a highly successful mercantile career, making a fortune that allowed him to retire in 1797 at the early age of 34 to pursue his scientific, geological and other interests. In 1809 he made the earliest attempt at a geological map of the United States of America.

Biography

Early life, business, and education
Maclure was born in 1763 in Ayr, Scotland.

After a brief visit to New York City in 1782, he began work with the merchants Miller, Hart & Co, who traded and shipped goods to and from America. Maclure was based in the London office but regularly travelled to France and Ireland on business. In 1796 business affairs took him to Virginia, which he thereafter made his home. 
In 1803 he visited France as one of the commissioners appointed to settle the claims of American citizens on the French government; and during the few years then spent in Europe he applied himself with enthusiasm to the study of geology.
While residing in Switzerland, he became impressed with what is now called the Pestalozzi School System, from Swiss pedagogist Johann Heinrich Pestalozzi (1746–1827).

Geological map
On his return home in 1807 he commenced the self-imposed task of making a geological survey of the United States. Almost every state in the Union was traversed and mapped by him, the Allegheny Mountains being crossed and recrossed some 50 times. The results of his unaided labours were submitted to the American Philosophical Society in a memoir entitled Observations on the Geology of the United States explanatory of a Geological Map, and published in the Society's Transactions,  together with the first geological map of that country, Maclure's 1809 Geological Map.  This antedates William Smith's geological map of England and Wales (with part of Scotland) by six years, although it was constructed using a different classification of rocks.

In 1812, while in France, Maclure became a member of the newly founded Academy of Natural Sciences of Philadelphia (ANSP). In 1817 Maclure became president of the ANSP, a post he held for the next 22 years.

In 1817, while residing in Europe, Maclure brought before the same society a revised edition of his map, and his great geological memoir, which he had issued separately, with some additional matter, under the title Observations on the Geology of the United States of America. Subsequent surveys have corroborated the general accuracy of Maclure's observations.

Later years
In 1819 he visited Spain, and attempted, unsuccessfully, to establish an agricultural college near the city of Alicante. Returning to America in 1824, he settled for some years at New Harmony, Indiana, seeking to develop his vision of the agricultural college. Failing health ultimately required him to relinquish the attempt and to seek (in 1827) a more congenial climate in Mexico. There, in 1840, at San Ángel, he died aged 77. His will provided for a trust fund consisting of most of his property. Under the terms of the Trust, 160 workingmen's libraries were established. The treatment of Maclure's burial site in Mexico was bereft of the honors due the respected humanitarian and geologist:

Summary of the second phase of Maclure's life (after Moore 1947)

New Harmony

The New Harmony commune in Indiana produced a number of geologists, naturalists, and botanists which were influenced by Maclure, such as: Robert Dale Owen (1801–1877), social reformer; David Dale Owen (1807–1860), geologist, artist; Jane Dale Owen Fauntleroy (1806–1861), educator; and Richard Owen (1810–1890) geologist, first president of Purdue University, Lafayette, Indiana.  They interacted there with a formidable crop of contemporary geologists, social reformers, botanists, paleobotanists, ethnologists, civil engineers, etc.

Published works 

 Maclure, W. 1817. Observations on the geology of the West India Islands, from Barbadoes to Santa Cruz, inclusive. Journal of the Academy of Natural Sciences of Philadelphia 1(6), 134–149. (BHL link)
 Maclure, W. 1818. Essay on the formation of rocks, or an inquiry into the probable origin of their present form and structure. Part 1. Journal of the Academy of Natural Sciences of Philadelphia 1(7), 261–276. (BHL link)
 Maclure, W. 1818. Essay on the formation of rocks, or an inquiry into the probable origin of their present form and structure. Part 2. Journal of the Academy of Natural Sciences of Philadelphia 1(7), 285–310. (BHL link)
 Maclure, W. 1818. Essay on the formation of rocks, or an inquiry into the probable origin of their present form and structure. Part 3. Journal of the Academy of Natural Sciences of Philadelphia 1(7), 327–345. (BHL link)
 Maclure, W. 1818. On the geology of the United States of North America, with remarks on the probable effects that may be produced by the decomposition of the different classes of rocks, on the nature and fertility of soils: applied to the different states of the Union agreeably to the accompanying geological map. Transactions of the American Philosophical Society new series 1, 1–92. (BHL link)

Primary Sources
The European Journals of William Maclure was a monumental book, describing, charting, and chronicling much of the features of Europe.

Taxonomic Eponyms 

 Charles Alexandre Lesueur described a new genus of fossil ammonites called Maclurite.
 Macluritidae an extinct family of relatively large, Lower Ordovician to Devonian, macluritacean gastropods is named in honor of Maclure.
 Maclura a genus of flowering plants in the mulberry family, Moraceae is named in honor of Maclure. The genus includes the inedible Osage-orange, which is used as mosquito repellent and grown throughout the United States as a hedging plant.

Geological Eponyms
Mount Maclure in Yosemite National Park.
Maclure Glacier, one of the last remaining glaciers in Yosemite National Park.

See also

Geologic map of Georgia

Footnotes

Further reading

 Harvey L. Carter, "William Maclure," Indiana Magazine of History, vol. 31, no. 2 (June 1935), pp. 83–91. In JSTOR
 Alberto Gil Novales, Maclure en España. Iniciativas de Cultura, 1981.
 Donald E. Pitzer, "William Maclure's Boatload of Knowledge: Science and Education into the Midwest", Indiana Magazine of History, vol. 94, (1998), pp. 110–135.
 Leonard Warren, Maclure of New Harmony: Scientist, Progressive Educator, Radical Philanthropist. Bloomington, IN: Indiana University Press, 2009.

External links
 Biography of William Maclure by James S. Aber
 William Maclure at University of Evansville
 New Harmony Workingmen's Institute, legacy of William Maclure at University of Evansville
 History of the Academy of Natural Sciences of Philadelphia
 New Harmony Scientists, Educators, Writers & Artists at University of Evansville

1763 births
1840 deaths
Scottish geologists
American geologists
People from New Harmony, Indiana
Members of the American Antiquarian Society